Ungers is a German surname. Notable people with the surname include:

Oswald Mathias Ungers (1926–2007), German architect, architectural theorist
Simon Ungers (1957–2006), German architect and artist

See also 
Ungers Corners, Ontario, a community in Ontario
Ungersheim, Alsace

German-language surnames